State Highway 14 is a state highway located entirely within Idaho County, Idaho.

Route description
It runs  from its western terminus at Idaho State Highway 13 near Grangeville to its eastern terminus at Sweeney Hill Road in unincorporated Elk City. SH-14 passes through two communities, Golden and Elk City. Its only junction with another numbered highway is at its western terminus at SH-13.

Major intersections

See also

 List of state highways in Idaho
 List of highways numbered 14

References

External links

014
Transportation in Idaho County, Idaho